Julie-Marie Parmentier (born 13 June 1981) is a French actress.

She began practising theater at nine years old, in Saint-Quentin, Aisne.

At the age of fifteen, she played in her first feature film, Petites, by Noémie Lvovsky. Since then, she has worked with many important directors.

She garnered critical acclaim for her roles in films such as Les Blessures Assassines by Jean-Pierre Denis, Charly  by Isild Le Besco and No et moi  by Zabou Breitman. She has been nominated for the César Award for Most Promising Actress for her role in Les Blessures Assassines and for which she won a Best Actress Award at the Mar del Plata Film Festival. She has also appeared in such films as Sheitan by Kim Shapiron, Around a Small Mountain by Jacques Rivette and Les Adieux à la reine by Benoît Jacquot.

She is also a famous actress on stage. She has collabored for more than ten years with André Engel, for who she played, among others, Cordelia in King Lear along Michel Piccoli, and Catherine in La petite Catherine de Heilbronn.

Julie-Marie worked at the Comédie-Française, where she was praised for Agnès in L'école des Femmes and Camille in On ne badine pas avec l'amour.

She won the Jean-Jacques Gauthier prize for Best Drama Actress for her monologue La séparation des songes by Jean Delabroy directed by Michel Didym.

Selected filmography

Literature 
Julie-Marie Parmentier has always been impassioned with English language. She learnt it to be able to read, speak and write in English.

She has also been learning Chinese.

In 2014, she wrote a children book Les aventures de Pip-Pip le moineau published at the Éditions L'Harmattan. Since then, she has written many novels.

YouTube Channel 
In 2019, Julie-Marie launched her theater channel on YouTube : Julie-Marie's Little Theater which she sees as an artistic experiment and performance. She does everything by herself, she writes some of the texts and plays poems in English.

She has a French channel, Le petit Théâtre de Julie-Marie, where she tells story for children and the history of theater. She plays monologues and various scenes.

Awards and nominations

Awards
 2001: Best Actress at the Mar del Plata Film Festival for Les Blessures Assassines
 2010: Jean-Jacques Gauthier prize for Best Drama Actress

Nominations
 2001: César Award for Most Promising Actress for Les Blessures Assassines
 2008: Moliere Award: nominated for Best Promising Actress for La Petite Catherine de Heilbronn

External links

 Julie-Marie's Little Theater
 Le petit Théâtre de Julie-Marie
 Site Officiel
 
 

1981 births
Living people
People from Saint-Quentin, Aisne
French film actresses
Com�die-Fran�aise
French stage actresses
21st-century French actresses